Seta Tuicuvu (born 7 September 1995 in Fiji) is a Fijian rugby union player who plays for  in the Top 14. His playing position is fullback. He made his debut for Fiji in 2018 against Scotland.

Reference list

External links
itsrugby.co.uk profile

1995 births
Fijian rugby union players
Fiji international rugby union players
Living people
Rugby union fullbacks
ASM Clermont Auvergne players
CA Brive players